William John St Clair Anstruther-Gray, Baron Kilmany, MC PC (5 March 1905 – 6 August 1985)  was a Scottish Unionist Party politician.

Life
The only son of Col William Anstruther-Gray of Kilmany and Clayre Jessie Tennant, he was educated at Eton College and at Christ Church, Oxford, England. 
He served as a Lieutenant in the Coldstream Guards from 1926–30, and with the Shanghai Defence Force in 1927–28.

He was elected as Unionist Member of Parliament (MP) for North Lanarkshire, in Scotland, in 1931, holding the seat until 1945. Until September 1939, he served as Parliamentary Private Secretary to Financial Secretary to the Treasury, and to Secretary for Overseas Trade, and latterly to Sir John Colville, Secretary of State for Scotland.

In September 1939, he rejoined the Coldstream Guards and served in North Africa, France and Germany with Coldstream Guards and Lothians and Border Horse. He was promoted to the rank of Major in 1942. He was awarded the Military Cross in 1943.

He served as Assistant Postmaster-General from May–July 1945.  He contested Berwick and East Lothian in February 1950, and was elected for the seat in 1951, holding it until 1966. He was Chairman of Ways and Means and Deputy Speaker of the House of Commons from 1962–64 (having been Deputy Chairman from 1959–62). He was Chairman of the  1922 Committee from 1964–66.

He was appointed Deputy Lieutenant of Fife in 1953, and Lord Lieutenant of Fife from 1975–80. He was also the Crown nominee for Scotland on the General Medical Council from 1952–65.

He was created a baronet in 1956, appointed a Privy Counsellor in 1962.

On his retirement from the House of Commons in 1966, he was created a life peer as  Baron Kilmany, of Kilmany in the County of Fife. His wife died in 1985, he in August the same year aged 80.

Family
In 1934, Anstruther-Gray married Monica Helen, only child of Geoffrey Lambton, second son of Frederick Lambton, 4th Earl of Durham.

References

External links 
 
 British Army Officers 1939–1945

1905 births
1985 deaths
Anglo-Scots
Chairmen of the 1922 Committee
Coldstream Guards officers
Recipients of the Military Cross
British Army personnel of World War II
Kilmany, William Anstruther-Gray, Baron
Unionist Party (Scotland) MPs
Members of the Privy Council of the United Kingdom
People educated at Eton College
Lord-Lieutenants of Fife
Alumni of Christ Church, Oxford
UK MPs 1931–1935
UK MPs 1935–1945
UK MPs 1951–1955
UK MPs 1955–1959
UK MPs 1959–1964
UK MPs 1964–1966
UK MPs who were granted peerages
Lothians and Border Horse officers
Baronets in the Baronetage of the United Kingdom
William
Scottish Conservative Party MPs
Ministers in the Churchill caretaker government, 1945